is a train station in Yamaguchi, Yamaguchi Prefecture, Japan.

Lines
West Japan Railway Company
Ube Line

Adjacent stations

Railway stations in Yamaguchi Prefecture
Railway stations in Japan opened in 1925